Epictia albifrons, known as Wagler's blind snake or silver snake, is a species of snake in the family Leptotyphlopidae of blind snakes native to Argentina (Tucuman, Salta), Bolivia, Brazil and South-Africa.

References

Epictia
Reptiles described in 1824